Pradeep Jayewardene House is the country house of the Jayewardene family. It is a pavilion-style villa which can be booked as holiday accommodation.

The original colonial bungalow was built in the northern outskirts of Mirissa, on a steep cliff that forms the eastern coast of Weligama Bay. It was used by J. R. Jayewardene and his family on their holidays. It was burnt down in 1987 during the early days of the JVP Insurrection, following the signing of the Indo-Sri Lanka Accord.

In 1997 Jayewardene's grandson, Pradeep, commissioned architect and family friend, Geoffrey Bawa, to rebuild the family holiday home.

References

Jayewardene family
Country houses in Sri Lanka
Geoffrey Bawa buildings
Buildings and structures in Matara District